Franjo Tuđman Bridge is a bridge over Neretva River located in Čapljina, Bosnia and Herzegovina.  It was named after Franjo Tuđman, the first President of Croatia, as are a bridge in Dubrovnik and one in Osijek.

References 

Bridges over the Neretva in Bosnia and Herzegovina